Gort an Choirce or Gort a' Choirce (meaning "oat field"), anglicised as Gortahork, is a village and townland in the northwest of County Donegal, Ireland. It is a Gaeltacht community, where the Irish language is the main language spoken in the area. Along with Falcarragh, it forms part of the district known as Cloughaneely.

Irish language
According to the 2016 census the population of Gort an Choirce was 185, with 41.6% of people speaking Irish on a daily basis outside the education system. This makes it 8th highest town by percentage of daily Irish speakers in Ireland.

Name
The official name of the townland is Gort an Choirce (anglicised to Gortahork), meaning "oat field". The townland is within the Roman Catholic parish of Críost Rí (Christ the King) and the Church of Ireland parish of Tullaghobegley East.

History

Evidence of ancient habitation in the townland includes a number of ring forts and souterrains in the area.

The village has a history of local enterprise, shops, forges, hotels, post office halls, and other meeting places for the communities in the surrounding areas.

It is claimed that a Charlie McGee, from Inishbofin, four miles offshore from Gort a' Choirce, was the first person to have been killed in the 1916 Easter Rising. McGee, who was a member of the Royal Irish Constabulary (RIC), was shot on duty while in Castlebellingham, County Louth. He was brought home to be buried in Gortahork, where an RIC tombstone now lies over his grave.

In 2006, Coláiste Uladh (the Ulster College) celebrated its centenary. Among those who attended the college were Pádraig Pearse, Joseph Mary Plunkett and Roger Casement – three participants in the 1916 Rising.

Community
The arts community in the area includes visual artists, poets, singers, musicians and others from or attracted to the area. Gort a' Choirce has been home to a documentary film festival which, in its first year, screened 30 films from 15 different countries.

Gortahork is mentioned in the opening lines of the Christy Moore song Lisdoonvarna.

The village is a base for wind surfers who come to Machaire Uí Rabhartaigh Beach.

Notable people
Natives include
 Cathal Ó Searcaigh, poet
 Micí Mac Gabhann, author of Irish language book Rotha Mór an tSaoil
 Breandán Mac Cnáimhsí, translator and RTÉ newsreader

Residents include
 Gerry Adams, President of Sinn Féin
 Phil Mac Giolla Bhain, journalist

References

Cloughaneely
Gaeltacht places in County Donegal
Gaeltacht towns and villages